Samuel Dickson (March 29, 1807 – May 3, 1858) was a United States representative from New York.

Biography
Samuel Dickson was born on March 29, 1807 in the portion of Bethlehem, New York that was later incorporated as the town of New Scotland.  He completed preparatory studies and graduated from Union College in 1825.

Dickson studied medicine, received a diploma from the Censors of the Medical Society of the State of New York in May 1829, and practiced in New Scotland.

Opposed to slavery and motivated to repeal the Kansas–Nebraska Act, Dickson was elected as an Opposition Party candidate to the Thirty-fourth Congress, holding office from March 4, 1855 to March 3, 1857.  He did not seek reelection in 1856, and returned to his New Scotland medical practice.

Dickson died from the lingering effects of an accident.  Near the end of his first session in Congress, Dickson stood up from the chair in which he was sitting in order to consult a book.  He did not notice that the chair overturned, and when he attempted to resume his seat, Dickson fell heavily onto the floor.  The concussion to his spine resulted in gradual paralysis, and within a few months he lost the use of his lower limbs.

Dickson's health continued to decline as a result of the fall.  He died in New Scotland on May 3, 1858.  He was buried in New Scotland's Presbyterian Church Cemetery.

References

Medical Society of the County of Albany, Obituary: Samuel Dickson, Transactions of the Medical Society of the County of Albany, 1806-1880, Volume 1, 1864, pages 333-334

1807 births
1858 deaths
People from Albany County, New York
Opposition Party members of the United States House of Representatives from New York (state)
Physicians from New York (state)
Union College (New York) alumni
Burials in New York (state)
19th-century American politicians
New Scotland, New York